Andrea Adolfati (1721 or 1722, Venice – 28 October 1760, Padua) was an Italian composer who is particularly remembered for his output of opera serias. His works are generally conventional and stylistically similar to the operas of his teacher Baldassare Galuppi. Although his music largely followed the fashion of his time, he did compose two tunes with unusual time signatures for his day: an air in  meter and another in  meter.

Adolfati studied music composition in Venice with composer Galuppi. After completing his studies he became the maestro di cappella at the Santa Maria della Salute, a position he held until 1745. He then worked in the same capacity at the court in Modena, where his divertimento da camera La pace fra la virtù e la bellezza premiered in 1746. Around the same time he composed some songs and arias for Johann Adolph Hasse's Lo starnuto di Ercole, which was given at the Teatro San Girolamo (a small theatre located in the Palazzo Labia) in 1745 and during Carnival 1746.

In 1748 Adolfati became maestro di cappella at the Basilica della Santissima Annunziata del Vastato in Genoa. On 30 May 1760 he became maestro di cappella of the Padua Cathedral, succeeding Giacomo Rampini, who had died three days earlier, in that post. He remained there for only a short period, as he also died just five months later.

Operas
Artaserse (opera seria, libretto by Metastasio, 1741, Verona; in collaboration with Pietro Chiarini)
La pace fra la virtù e la bellezza (divertimento da camera, libretto by Liborati, Metastasio, 1746, Modena)
Didone abbandonata (dramma, libretto by Metastasio, 1747, Venice)
Il corsaro punito (dramma giocoso, 1750, Pavia)
Arianna (dramma, libretto by Pietro Pariati, 1750, Genoa)
La gloria e il piacere (introduction to music on the ball, 1751, Genoa)
Adriano in Siria (dramma, libretto by Metastasio, 1751, Genoa)
Il giuoco dei matti (commedia per musica, 1751, Genoa)
Ifigenia (dramma per musica, 1751, Genoa)
Ipermestra (dramma, libretto by Metastasio, 1752, Modena)
Vologeso (dramma, basato su Lucio Vero by Apostolo Zeno, 1752, Genoa)
La clemenza di Tito (dramma, libretto by Metastasio, 1753, Vienna)
Sesostri re d'Egitto (dramma, libretto by Apostolo Zeno, 1755, Genoa)

Other works
Miserere for 4 voices and instruments
Nisi Dominus for 1 voice, basso continuo
Laudate for 4 voices
In exitu for 5 voices and instruments
Domine ne in furore for 4 voices and instruments
6 cantatas for soprano and instruments
Già la notte s'avvicina (text by Metastasio)
Filen, crudo Fileno
Perdono amata Nice (text by Metastasio)
Ingratissimo Tirsi
No, non turbarti, o Nice (text by Metastasio)
Cantata for 2
Varie arie
6 sonatas for 2 violins, 2 flutes, 2 horns, bassoon, and contrabassoon
Sinfonia in F major
Overture in D major

Sources
R. Giazotto, La musica a Genova nella vita pubblica e privata dal XIII al XVIII secolo (Genoa, 1951)
B. Brunelli, Pietro Metastasio: Tutte le opere, (Milan, 1951–4)
Karl Gustav Fellerer, "Thematische Verzeichnisse der fürstbischöflichen Freisingischen Hofmusik von 1796", Festschrift Otto Erich Deutsch, pp. 296–302 (Kassel, 1963)
S. Pintacuda, Genova, Biblioteca dell'Istituto musicale "Nicolò Paganini": catalogo (Milan, 1966)
A. Zaggia, "La fiera delle bagatelle: il teatro musicale per marionette di San Girolamo (Venice, 1746–1748)", Rassegna veneta di studi musicali, vol. II–III, pp. 133–71 (1986–7)
S. Mamy, La musique à Venise et l'imaginaire français des Lumières, pp. 30–1, 175 (Paris, 1996)
S. Hansell, C. Steffan, "Andrea Adolfati" in The New Grove Dictionary of Music and Musicians
A.Adolfati, Sei cantate a voce sola con stromenti, prima edizione moderna a cura di Davide Mingozzi (Armelin musica, 2014)

1721 births
1760 deaths
Italian male classical composers
Italian opera composers
Male opera composers
18th-century Italian composers
18th-century Italian male musicians